Providence Christian Academy is a private, college preparatory, non-denominational Christian school offering classes from kindergarten to 12th grade. It is located in Lilburn, Georgia, United States. Founded in 1991, Providence has graduated over 1200 students. Providence is not affiliated with any specific church or denomination, and students, faculty, and staff come from a variety of religious backgrounds.

History 
Providence opened on September 6, 1991, with an enrollment of just 354 students in K-12th grade. The school occupied two-thirds of a strip shopping center, and all the desks, furniture, and computers were donated. The class of 1992, the first senior class, named the school "Providence".

During its first six years Providence grew by 50 students each year, and in 1993 purchased the building it was in and expanded into the entire building. By 2007, Providence had over 800 students.

In 2011, the school added football and the iProv initiative, which issued iPads to students in 7th-12th grades, and the school changed its mascot from the "Stars" to the "Storm". In 2013, the school announced the construction of the Lamar Lussi Athletic Complex, a multi-sport complex named in honor of PCA Director of Encouragement Lamar Lussi. It was scheduled to be completed in early 2016.

Athletics 
Providence Athletics have won a total of five state championships:
 Girls' soccer: 1999
 Softball: 2000
 Girls' soccer: 2007
 Gymnastics: 2009
 Baseball: 2011

Notable alumni 
 Andy Hull, lead singer of the indie rock band Manchester Orchestra
 Collin McHugh, MLB pitcher, 2017 World Series Champion (New York Mets, Colorado Rockies, Houston Astros)
 Garrett Whitlock, MLB pitcher for the Boston Red Sox

References

External links 
 Providence Christian Academy
 Providence Sports on MaxPreps

Christian schools in Georgia (U.S. state)
Nondenominational Christian schools in the United States
Private high schools in Georgia (U.S. state)
Schools in Gwinnett County, Georgia
Private middle schools in Georgia (U.S. state)
Private elementary schools in Georgia (U.S. state)
Preparatory schools in Georgia (U.S. state)
Educational institutions established in 1991
1991 establishments in Georgia (U.S. state)